Mindat District is a district in the Chin State of Myanmar. It consists of two townships and 840 villages.

History 
In 1948, after the formation of the constitution for the Union of Burma, Pakokku province was created with two districts - Pakokku District and Mindat District. They comprised a total of 11 townships - Pakokku (capital city), Mindat, Yesagyo, Pauk, Seikphyu, Myaing, Gangaw, Htilin, Saw, Kanpetlet, and Matupi.

On March 2nd, 1962 the military led by General Ne Win took control of Burma through a coup d'état, which put the government under the direct control of the military. A new constitution of the Socialist Republic of the Union of Burma was established on May 4th, 1974.

Pakokku province was then broken up in a fashion, whereby Pakokku District was added to the Magway Division, and Mindat District was added to Chin State.

Townships
Mindat District contains the townships of Mindat and Kanpetlet.

References

 

 Districts of Myanmar
Chin State